195 Medium Regiment (Banwat) is part of the Regiment of Artillery of the Indian Army.

Formation 
The regiment was raised on 15 February 1965 at Bangalore as 195 Mountain Regiment. The regiment was subsequently converted to a field regiment and is presently a medium regiment.

Class composition
The regiment was raised as a pure South Indian Class regiment.

Operations
The regiment has taken part in the following operations –
Indo-Pakistani War of 1971
The regiment commanded by Lieutenant Colonel Satjit Singh, was part of the 25 Artillery Brigade and was equipped with 75/24 Pack Howitzers. It was deployed in the Poonch Sector in Jammu and Kashmir, primarily in support of 93 Infantry Brigade. The regiment fired around 12,500 rounds in the defensive battle of Poonch between 3 and 7 December, thus fizzling the Pakistani 12 Infantry Division offensive. The regiment played an important part in the capture of Nangi Tekri on 11 December 1971. Captain D Tyagi, the OP officer from the Regiment was part of the daring attack of the gun position at Mandhol by 9 Para (SF) on 13 December.

The regiment earned the ‘honour title’ Banwat and the sobriquet Defenders of Poonch for its gallant actions on 3 and 4 December in the defence of Banwat, which is located north east of Poonch.
It won the following gallantry awards –
Vishisht Seva Medal (VSM) - Lieutenant Colonel Satjit Singh
Sena Medal – Gunner Rama Murti
Mentioned in dispatches – Major CM Bhalla, Captain SS Sandhu
Operation Meghdoot

Operation Parakram 
The regiment took active part in the operation and its guns saw action against the Pakistani army.

Operation Rakshak 
The regiment has taken part in counter insurgency operations in Jammu and Kashmir and has completed four tenures in the state.

Honours and achievements
Seven of the commanding officers of the regiment have become general officers. They include – 
Lieutenant General AS Parmar , who was the Commandant, School of Artillery
Lieutenant General MPS Bhandari , who was also the Director General Artillery
Lieutenant General A Natarajan , who was the Adjutant-General of the Indian Army
Major General DS Chimni
Major General Kuldip Chandra Vig 
Major General MN Kashid 
Major General Mohabat Singh
Brigadier Satjit Singh 
Brigadier AJS Behl
Brigadier Balwinder Singh
Brigadier SN Bhaduri
The Regiment has the distinction of having five Brigadiers currently serving in the Indian Army. 
Chinna Raju Srither of the regiment is a national level archer and has won numerous medals as part of the men's compound team, including a silver at the 2010 Commonwealth Games, a silver at the Archery World Cup in 2011 and a gold at the Archery World Cup in 2017.
Havildar Latheesh VS is a national level rower.

See also
List of artillery regiments of Indian Army

References

Military units and formations established in 1965
Artillery regiments of the Indian Army after 1947
Medium artillery regiments